Phragmataecia brunni is a species of moth of the family Cossidae. It is found in Tanzania.

References

Endemic fauna of Tanzania
Moths described in 1892
Phragmataecia
Insects of Tanzania
Moths of Africa